Theatre 18+ is a non-state theatre opened in Rostov-on-Don in January 2013.

History of the theatre
The creation of the on the territory of the former pasta factory was first announced in August 2012. Initially, the opening of the theatre, the founders of which were the Gallery 16thLINE and Minicult, was scheduled for November 2012. It was immediately noted that the Theatre18+ intends to focus on modern drama, with which traditional theatres do not dare to work. Yuri Muravitsky was declared the artistic director of theatre, the chief director was Olga Kalashnikova.
The opening of the theatre was planned for January 31, 2013 at the same time as the opening of the cultural site MAKARONKA. It was also announced a comedy A Secret project "Bugs 64 " by Sergei Medvedev. During the opening the first premiere was presented. It was a documentary thrash musical Dad staged by Yuri Muravitsky and based on the play by Lyubov Mulmenko, as well as an exhibition of the art group SITO.
In the renovated territory of the former pasta factory a theater auditorium with 80 seats and exhibition grounds were placed. The total exhibition area exceeds one thousand square metres.
Originally, theatre did not plan to acquire their own troupe, as each project was expected to gather the appropriate cast. Nowadays the artistic director of Theatre18+ is Yuri Muravitsky, the main director of the theatre since 2015 is Herman Grekov.
According to Yevgeny Samoilov, his own productions will be performed in the theatre as long as the audience is interested.

In February 2013, a tour of Moscow Theatre.doc was organized within thatre`s walls.

In April 2013, the Theatre18+was invited to the stage of Saint Petersburg Theatre workshop CRS with the performances of Alexei Yankovsky's The Girl and the matches and The Evil Performance.

In September 2013, the theatre joined the program Theatre+society, during which Rostov students aged 9 to 16 years under the direction of Yuri Muravitsky and Olga Kalashnikova wrote seven plays for the theatre.

In October 2013, the festival of modern drama and directing Direct speech was held at the Theatre18+ within which the Rostov citizens could see the performances The Owner of the Coffee Shop (Post Theater, St. Petersburg), Pavlik is my God (Theater. Joseph Beuys, Moscow), Light my Fire (Theatre.doc, Moscow) and documentaries Goal and Between us.

In 2014, the performance Dad took part in the non-competitive program New play of the festival The Golden mask (Moscow).

In November 2015, the performance Sonosopher became the participant of the VI International festival of chamber theatres and performances of small forms ArtOkraine (St.-Petersburg)[10].

In 2016 Sonosopher was invited as a participant in the 46th Week of Slovenian Drama, which took place from March 27 to April 8, 2016 in Kranj (Slovenia)[11].

Repertoire
2013 – Dad (dir. Yu Muravitsky, drum. L. Mulmenko, S. Medvedev, M. Zelinskaya)
2013 – As Alive (dir. O. Kalashnikova, drama. M. Zelinskaya)
2013 – The Cat is Guilty in My Sexuality (dir. Oh. Nevmerzhitskaya, drum. A. Donatova)
2013 – Girls (dir. O. Kalashnikova, drama. V. Levanov, premiere – 2012) 
2013 – Toad (dir. Ruslan Malikov, drum. S. Medvedev)
2013 – The Incredible Adventures of Julia and Natasha (dir. and drama. – Yu. Muravitsky, G. Grekov)
2014 – Session (dir. O. Zibrova, libretto – S. Medvedev)
2014 – Still Ahead (dir. O. Kalashnikov)
2014 – Casting (dir. Mr. Greeks, drum. G. the Greeks and Yuri Muravitsky)
2015 – Love, Dream and Bigudi (dir. O. Zibrov, AMD. A. Donatova)
2016 – Sasha, Take out the Garbage (dir. O. Zibrov, AMD. N. Vorozhbit)
2017 – Wonderland (dir. V. Lisovsky)[24][25]
2017 – Production of Delirium (dir. E. Matveev, drum. P. Pryazhko)
2017 – Khanana (dir. Yu Muravitsky, drum. G. Greeks)
2017 – Black Caviar (dir. O. Zibrov, AMD. S. Medvedev)
2018 – Chronicles of Macbeth. Kings of the Porch (dir. Mr. Greeks, drum. M. Volokhov)

Quotes
"We want to do interdisciplinary projects at the confluence of theatre and modern art. First and foremost, we will rely on the gallery of the 16th Line, and Olga Kalashnikova's (one of the founders of the new theatre) space Minicult, who has several performances. There is also the festival "Rostov readings" which involves young actors who take part in reading, including Youth theatre, we also will work with them. So some kind of the context has already been in the city. There are some events which are not connected with any centers. In Rostov there are three playwright – Anna Donatova, Maria Zelinskaya and Sergei Medvedev. We plan to stage their plays"— Yuri Muravitsky, 2012.
"Moskvich Muravitsky subscribed to the Rostov history, of course, not only because the town is cute, don't want instagram . For him it is more important that the theatre is a non – governmental and doesn't have to be answerable to anyone for the artistic part. More exactly, there is investor Samoylov, but he is a living, concrete person, here – another form of accountability and other criteria. They can be discussed, they are above the law. And the second thing: "18+" is a startup and it’s not  someone's ready turret with  history" — Lyubov Mulmenko, 2013.
"Suddenly, the theater became a hobby and one of my favorite cases to do. The business was not a calculating, of course, that’s why  material risks didn't bother me. First and foremost, I thought about what qualities it needs to have and in which direction to grow" — Evgeny Samoylov,2018.

References 

Theatres in Russia
Tourist attractions in Rostov-on-Don
Buildings and structures in Rostov-on-Don